Charles Toppin (9 August 1864 – 8 June 1928) was an English cricketer who played 25 first-class matches in the late 19th century. The bulk of these (20) were for Cambridge University, but he also appeared twice each for the Gentlemen and Gentlemen of England, and once for Marylebone Cricket Club (MCC).

Charles Toppin was educated at Sedbergh School and St John's College, Cambridge. He made his first-class debut for Cambridge against C. I. Thornton's England XI in May 1885, claiming Thornton's wicket as his first at this level.
His best bowling figures came in the Varsity Match against Oxford University at Lord's later that same season, when his first-innings return of 7-51 set up a seven-wicket victory.

Toppin appeared for the Gentlemen against the Players at Lord's in 1885 and 1886, while he continued to play for Cambridge until 1887, being selected for both Varsity matches. After a gap of several years, he made one final first-class appearance in 1891 when he played for MCC against Somerset at Taunton. He also played several times for Cumberland and for Worcestershire in its pre-first-class days.

He was a master for 42 years at Malvern College, Worcestershire, where he also coached the cricket team. He encouraged batsmen to attack, with an emphasis on front-foot drives. Several of his pupils became Test players, including R. E. Foster, Frank Mann, Donald Knight and Errol Holmes.

Two of Toppin's sons, another Charles and John, each played briefly for Worcestershire.

References

External links

Obituary, Wisden 1929

1864 births
1928 deaths
People educated at Sedbergh School
Alumni of St John's College, Cambridge
English cricketers
Cambridge University cricketers
Marylebone Cricket Club cricketers
Gentlemen cricketers
Gentlemen of England cricketers
English cricket coaches